These are the team rosters of the 16 teams competing in the 2011 FIBA Asia Championship for Women.

Level I

Head coach: Sun Fengwu

Head coach: Chang Hui-ying

Head coach:  Pete Gaudet

Head coach: Fumikazu Nakagawa

Head coach: Lim Dal-Shik

Head coach: Elie Nasr

Level II

Head coach:  Bill McCammon

Head coach: Tatyana Kondius

Head coach: Tan See Wah

Head coach: Chiew Poh Leng

Head coach: Ajit Kuruppu

Head coach: Stepan Lebedev

References
 Official website

squads
FIBA Women's Asia Cup squads